The 2010–11 Ashes series (known as the Vodafone Ashes Series for sponsorship reasons) was the 66th series of Test cricket matches played to contest The Ashes. The series was played in Australia as part of the England cricket team's tour of the country during the 2010–11 season. Five Tests were played from 25 November 2010 to 7 January 2011. England won the series 3–1 and retained the Ashes, having won the previous series in 2009 by two Tests to one. It was the first time in 24 years that England had won the Ashes in Australia. As of 2021–22, it remains the most recent occasion that a visiting team has won an Ashes series, and as of 2022, the last time that England has won a Test match in Australia

Background
Prior to the start of the 2010–11 Ashes series, Australia had won 31 series to England's 29. The remaining five were draws. England won the most recent series in 2009 by two Tests to one, but Australia had whitewashed the last one held on home soil (the 2006–07 series), winning 5–0. The last time England won the Ashes on Australian soil was in 1986–87.

The two countries also met in the 2010 ICC World Twenty20 final in Bridgetown, Barbados on 16 May, with England winning by seven wickets with three overs to spare to claim their first ICC world championship. The two sides also played each other in England in June and July 2010 in a five-match ODI series as a prelude to the upcoming summer. England won the first three ODIs to claim the series, but the Australians won the last two.

The Australians remained in England to face Pakistan, losing both Twenty20 Internationals and drawing a two-Test series 1–1. England, meanwhile, beat Bangladesh 2–1 in a three-match ODI series and beat Pakistan in a controversial series – 3–1 in a four-match Test series, 2–0 in two T20Is and 3–2 in a five-match ODI series.

In the weeks leading up to the Ashes, Australia faced both India and Sri Lanka in India and Australia respectively. Australia played India in two Tests and three ODIs during October. They lost both Tests, and lost the ODI series 1–0, with the first and third games washed out without any cricket played. Sri Lanka faced Australia during the early part of November with Sri Lanka winning the only Twenty20 International and winning the ODI series 2–1.

Venues
As with other recent Ashes series in Australia, this series was played at the main cricket grounds in Australia's five largest cities. Tickets for the Ashes series started selling on 25 July 2010, and within a week many Test days were sold out.

Squads
The England squad was announced on 23 September 2010. In addition to England's 16-man squad, a 15-man Performance Programme squad was named that also toured Australia during the series. That squad arrived in Brisbane on 13 November, before playing a four-day match against a Queensland XI (25–28 November) and a Western Australia XI (7–10 December) in Perth before departing on 16 December.

A 17-man Australian squad was announced on 15 November 2010 for the first Ashes Test, and the squad was reduced to 13 five days later. The players included in that initial squad but who were not part of a final Test squad are marked with an asterisk below. In addition to the original 17-man squad, left-arm spinner Michael Beer and left-handed opening batsman Phillip Hughes were later called up for the final three Tests. When captain Ricky Ponting was ruled out of the final Test with a broken finger, Michael Clarke took over as captain and Brad Haddin became vice-captain.

Matches

First Test

On the opening day, Peter Siddle – celebrating his 26th birthday – took a hat-trick and achieved his best Test career figures to date with 6/54. He dismissed Cook (caught Watson), Prior (bowled) and Broad (lbw) to take the first Ashes hat-trick since Darren Gough took three wickets in Sydney in 1999. The hat-trick reduced England from a comfortable 4/197 to 7/197, and England were eventually all out in their first innings for 260. Debutant Xavier Doherty took his first Test wicket by dismissing Ian Bell during the innings.

In reply, Australia were reduced to 5/143, before Michael Hussey (195) and Brad Haddin (136) compiled a partnership of 307 runs, a record sixth-wicket partnership at the Gabba, to guide Australia to finish on 481 all out. Although bowler Steven Finn finished with figures of 6/125 on his Ashes debut, England conceded a 221-run first innings deficit.

But in the second innings, England responded with an impressive top-order performance. Strauss (110) and Cook (235 not out) made a 188-run opening partnership; an English record at the ground, during which they overtook Jack Hobbs and Herbert Sutcliffe as England's highest-scoring pair of opening batsmen. Jonathan Trott (135 not out) then joined Cook for an unbeaten 329-run partnership before England declared on 1/517 in anticipation for a draw. Cook's score of 235 not out broke Don Bradman's record for the highest Test score at the Gabba.

With the target at 297 runs from 41 overs for victory, Australia moved to 1/107, with Ricky Ponting making a quick 51, before a draw was declared.

Second Test

For the second Test, Australia made two changes to its fast bowling attack; dropping Mitchell Johnson and Ben Hilfenhaus and bringing in Doug Bollinger and Ryan Harris. England fielded an unchanged side. After electing to bat first, Australia made their worst start to a Test match in 60 years. Simon Katich hesitated when Shane Watson called for a single and was run out without facing a ball by Jonathan Trott, who registered a direct hit with just one stump to aim at. Anderson then had Ponting caught by Graeme Swann at second slip with the next delivery for a golden duck. Katich's diamond duck was the first by an Australian since Wayne Phillips against the West Indies in Port of Spain in 1983-84. In his next over, Anderson then got Clarke to edge to Swann to leave Australia at 3/2. Michael Hussey made 93 before Swann had him caught by Collingwood and Australia were bowled out just before stumps on Day 1 for 245.

On the second day, England captain Andrew Strauss was dismissed for a single in the first over of the day's play, bowled by a Bollinger delivery that he left alone. At the close of day two, Alastair Cook had made 136 not out; when combined with his score of 235 not out in the second innings of the first Test, Cook broke the England record for runs scored and minutes at the crease without being dismissed. This consisted of 371 runs in 1,022 minutes of play.

Early on the third morning, Kevin Pietersen reached his first century since March 2009 before Cook was out for 148. Supported first by Paul Collingwood (42) and then Ian Bell (68 not out), Pietersen reached the second double-century of his career. Pietersen was finally out for a Test-best 227 before England declared on 5/620. This was the first time that the England team had passed the 500 run mark in successive innings in the Ashes and left Australia needing 375 runs to make England bat again.

Australia began batting early on day four and started a fightback before losing the wicket of Michael Clarke (80) off the last ball of the day from Pietersen's part-time off-spin. Although Hussey completed a half-century, England took the final six wickets in the final morning session to win by an innings and 71 runs, beginning with Steven Finn taking the key wicket of Hussey by getting him into a mistake on a pull shot that went to Anderson at mid-on. Anderson then claimed the next two, including notably Ryan Harris on a first-ball LBW. With two first-ball ducks, Harris became only the second Australian in Test cricket to earn a king pair (the first being Adam Gilchrist against India in Kolkata in 2000–01). Swann then provided the finishing touch with his 10th five-wicket haul in Tests and first against Australia by claiming the last three wickets of North, Doherty and Siddle; the wicket of North was originally not called but confirmed LBW by DRS. The result was the 100th time England had beaten Australia in a Test match.

Third Test

Following an innings defeat, Australia made four changes, with pace bowlers Johnson and Hilfenhaus returning in place of Bollinger and Doherty, Steve Smith (at that time considered an all-rounder) replacing North in the middle-order, and opener Phillip Hughes replacing the injured Katich. Australia's bowling attack comprised four main pace bowlers and Smith as the main spinner. England made one change, with Chris Tremlett chosen to replace the injured Broad.

On the first day, Tremlett marked his return to Test cricket with three top-order wickets as Australia were reduced to 5/69. However, the middle-lower order rescued Australia with Michael Hussey, Brad Haddin and Mitchell Johnson scoring half-centuries. Australia were finally bowled out for 268 runs.

On the second day, England reached 0/78 before suffering a batting collapse with Johnson taking 6/38. In a spell costing just 7 runs, he accounted for Cook (32), Trott (4), Pietersen (0) and Collingwood (5) to leave England 5/98. Strauss and Bell made half-centuries before Johnson took two further wickets as England were all out for 187.

Starting their second innings with a lead of 81 runs, Australia lost Hughes, Ponting and Clarke cheaply before Hussey and Watson steadied the innings with a 113-run partnership. Watson fell five short of his century, but Hussey recorded his second century of the series before a late flurry of wickets left Australia being bowled out for 309. Hussey was last-man-out for 116 and that wicket completed Tremlett's maiden Test five-wicket haul.

Needing 391 runs for victory, England quickly collapsed to 5/81. Johnson picked up two more wickets, and Ben Hilfenhaus collected his first since the opening over of the series as the openers and Pietersen fell cheaply. Ricky Ponting damaged a finger parrying Trott to wicket-keeper Haddin in the penultimate over, before Paul Collingwood was caught behind off Harris from the last ball of the day. On day four, the remaining England batsmen were quickly bowled out within ten overs. The final five wickets fell for just 42 runs with Ryan Harris taking 6/47. England were all out for 123 and lost the game by 267 runs. For his combined 63 runs and 9/82, Johnson won the Man of the Match award.

Fourth Test

Despite being the series' leading wicket-taker, Steven Finn was rested by England for the much-anticipated Boxing Day Test and replaced by Tim Bresnan, who had been with Collingwood, Broad and Swann in the T20 side that had beaten Australia in the ICC World Twenty20 Final back in May. James Anderson was cleared to play after a slight side strain. Australia were unchanged, with Ricky Ponting also cleared to play despite a fractured little finger on his left hand.

Strauss won the toss and elected to bowl. Watson was dropped twice without scoring off Anderson before Tremlett claimed his wicket. Tremlett later had Ponting caught behind before Anderson took the vital wicket of Hussey, who had achieved at least fifty in every innings of the series, in the last over before lunch. None of the Australian batsmen offered much resistance as they were bowled out for 98 before tea: their lowest Ashes total at the MCG. All ten dismissals were catches behind the stumps, with Matt Prior becoming the fourth English wicket-keeper to take six catches in an innings; of the remaining catches, two were taken at slip and two at gully. Anderson and Tremlett took four wickets each while Bresnan took the remaining two.

In reply, England's openers advanced to 0/157 at the end of the first day's play before both fell early the following morning. Australia reviewed a caught-behind appeal for Pietersen when on 49, which upheld Aleem Dar's not out verdict; however, Ponting continued to debate the decision with both umpires and was fined 40% of his match fee. Pietersen was out soon after for 51 and was followed by Collingwood (8) and Bell (1). Prior was then given out caught behind early in his innings; however, Dar called for the third umpire for a suspected no ball. This was confirmed and Prior continued to support Trott, eventually making 85 while Trott achieved his fifth Test century and eventually finished not out on 168 as England reached 513 all out. Australia had a bright spot in Victoria native and state captain Siddle, who took a six-wicket haul, but they lost Harris for the rest of the series when he fractured his ankle in a run-up.

By the time they began their second innings, Australia were in a worse situation than at Adelaide, needing to make 415 runs just to make England bat again, a man down (Harris being unable to bat after his ankle injury), and with more than half the match left to play. Australia got off to a quick start before Hughes was run out off Swann's bowling. Bresnan then took three wickets – Watson lbw, captain Ponting bowled and Hussey caught for a duck – to leave Australia 104/4. Australia finished day 3 on 169/6, 246 runs behind. An 86-run partnership on the fourth morning between Haddin and Siddle delayed the inevitable, but after Swann had Siddle caught by Pietersen at long-on, Bresnan dismissed Hilfenhaus for a pair to seal the match. Australia were bowled out for 258 and England retained the Ashes, winning by an innings and 157 runs to go up 2–1 in the series with one match left to play.

The losses at Adelaide and Melbourne also meant that it was the first time that Australia had ever lost two Tests in a home series by an innings.

Fifth Test

Prior to the fifth Test match, Ricky Ponting was declared unfit to play due to the injury to his left little finger. Michael Clarke became Australia's 43rd Test captain, while Brad Haddin assumed vice-captain responsibilities. Usman Khawaja made his Test debut in place of Ponting and became the first Pakistani Australian to play for Australia. Spinner Michael Beer also made his Test debut, and became the 10th spinner to feature in the Australian side since Shane Warne's retirement in 2007.

Clarke won the toss and elected to bat in overcast conditions. Watson, Hughes, Khawaja and Clarke all passed 30, but none of the top order reached a half-century. After Hussey was dismissed by all-rounder Collingwood, playing in his final Test having announced his retirement from Test cricket on the fourth morning, Smith and Siddle soon followed to leave Australia at 8/189. However, 53 from Johnson and 34 from Hilfenhaus allowed Australia finish on 280 all out.

England's openers batted positively, with Strauss making 60 off 58 balls before being bowled by Hilfenhaus. Fellow opener Cook continued his excellent form, making his third century and passing 700 runs for the series. After Cook departed for 189, Ian Bell made his first century in Ashes cricket in his 18th Test match against Australia. There was minor controversy when Bell overturned a caught-behind dismissal whilst on 67 – it was overturned because Hotspot showed no edge on the bat, but Snickometer (which was shown by the broadcaster, but at that time was not used in the referral process) detected an edge. After England passed 500 for the fourth time in the series, wicketkeeper Matt Prior reached his fourth Test hundred, his first against Australia, from just 109 balls – the fastest English Ashes century since Ian Botham in 1981 at Old Trafford. His century meant that six out of England's top seven had made centuries during the series. England reached 644 before being bowled out, their highest ever total in an Ashes Test in Australia.

Needing 364 to make England bat again, several Australian batsmen again made starts before getting out. Watson made a brisk 38 before a mix-up left both him and Hughes at the same end for an easy run-out, the third run-out of the series that he was involved in. Clarke scored 41 in his second innings as captain and Haddin made 30, but Tremlett then tempted Haddin into playing a bouncer behind to Prior before clean-bowling Johnson with his next delivery, prompting an extra half hour of play on Day 4. In an eighth-wicket partnership worth 80 runs, Smith made an unbeaten half-century and Siddle made 43; however, after Siddle was removed, Hilfenhaus soon departed for just 7 before Tremlett took the final wicket: Beer bowled, playing on, for 2. Australia's total was 281 and England won by an innings and 83 runs. This was the third time they had won by an innings in the series – the first time a touring side had ever won three Tests by an innings during a single series.

Cook was named Man of the Series after scoring 766 runs for England, and also Man of the Match for his 189 runs in the first innings.

Statistics

Individual

Team

Other
England
 In the 2nd innings of the 1st Test, Alastair Cook achieved his maiden Test double-century and his then highest Test score of 235 (not out). This was also the highest Test innings score for a single batsman at the Gabba.
 In the 1st innings of the 2nd Test, Ian Bell reached a career total of 4,000 runs when he scored 68 (not out).
 In the 1st innings of the 2nd Test, Kevin Pietersen hit 227, his highest Test score.
 In the 2nd innings of the 3rd Test, James Anderson reached a career total of 200 wickets when he had Peter Siddle caught out.
 In the 2nd innings of the 3rd Test, Chris Tremlett achieved his first five-wicket haul.
 In the 1st innings of the 4th Test, Andrew Strauss reached a career total of 6,000 runs.
 In the 1st innings of the 4th Test, Matt Prior reached a career total of 2,000 runs.
 In the 1st innings of the 5th Test, Alastair Cook reached a career total of 5,000 runs; he was the second-youngest player to reach this landmark, after Sachin Tendulkar. He also made his third century of the series and stands as the series' highest run-scorer.
 In the 1st innings of the 5th Test, England scored their highest team total ever in Australia.
 In the 1st innings of the 5th Test, England's 6th, 7th and 8th wicket partnerships all made 100, the first time this has ever happened in Test cricket.
 England amassed a total of nine centuries off six different batsmen. This is a record for England in the Ashes.
 England surpassed 500 runs four times. This is the first time they had done so in any series.
 England became the first touring team to win three matches by an innings in a single Test series.
 England won the Ashes in Australia for the first time in 24 years.

Australia
 In the 1st innings of the 1st Test, Peter Siddle took a hat-trick. This was the first Test hat-trick by an Australian since Glenn McGrath in 2000, and the first in an Ashes series since Darren Gough in 1999. Overall, it was the 38th Test hat-trick, the 11th by an Australian, and the 9th by a Victorian. The hat-trick was taken on his 26th birthday, 25 November 2010.
 In the 2nd innings of the 3rd Test, Ryan Harris achieved his first five-wicket haul.
 Australia's first-innings total of 98 in the 4th Test was its lowest first-innings ever in a Melbourne Test, and its lowest completed first innings score in a home Ashes Test since 1936.
 Captain Ricky Ponting averaged 16.14 runs across the series, the lowest average by an Australian captain in an Ashes series in Australia since Brian Booth in 1965–66.

Media

Television
Nine Network: Australia
Sky Sports: United Kingdom and Ireland (HD) Highlights ITV4
Star Cricket: India
Willow Cricket: USA
GEO Super: Pakistan
SuperSport: South Africa, Zimbabwe and Kenya
Sky Network Television: New Zealand (HD)
Asian Television Network: Canada
Orbit Showtime: Middle East

Radio
ABC Radio Grandstand: Australia
BBC Radio 4 and BBC Radio 5 Live Sports Extra: England

Notes

References

External links
The Ashes 2010–11 on CricInfo

2010-11
Ashes series
2010 in English cricket
2011 in English cricket
International cricket competitions in 2010–11